Buzara propyrrha is a moth of the family Erebidae. It is found in Australia and Fiji.

The wingspan is about 40 mm.

References

External links
Image
Species info

Calpinae
Moths described in 1858